Dong Yong (other names: 董勇, Tung Yung; born 15 December 1968, China) is a Chinese actor. He studied singing, opera and kung-fu.

Biography
Yong moved into television shortly after he graduated and has since become one of the most sought-after actors in Chinese television. His films include: Black Hole, Task Force No. 6, Tree Of Love, Absolute Control, 120 Million, Dead Man's Diary, Evil Blaster, The Oliver Tree Of My Life, Seven Years' Marriage and No Divorce For Me.

Filmography
Dong Yong has appeared in the following films:

 Gimme Kudos (2005)
 Fearless (2006) - Nong Jinsun
 Lady Cop & Papa Crook (2008)
 Murderer (2009)
 Ocean Heaven (2010)
 The Lost Bladesman (2011)
 The Silent War (2012)
 A Mysterious Bullet (2014)
 For Love or Money (2014)
 Age of Glory (2015)
 Battle of Xiangjiang River (2017)
 Game of Hunting (2017)
 Novoland: Eagle Flag (2019)

References

External links

Living people
Male actors from Zhejiang
1968 births
Male actors from Hangzhou
Chinese male film actors
Chinese male television actors
National Academy of Chinese Theatre Arts alumni
Chinese male Peking opera actors
20th-century Chinese male actors
21st-century Chinese male actors
Middle School Affiliated to the National Academy of Chinese Theatre Arts alumni